James W. Gray (September 21, 1915 – August 5, 1987) was an American judge and politician.

Gray was born in East St. Louis, Illinois. He went to Central Catholic High School in East St. Louis. Gray graduated from University of Illinois, Saint Louis University School of Law and was admitted to the Illinois and Missouri bars. Gray served in the United States Army during World War II. Gray lived in Belleville, Illinois with his wife and family and practiced law. Gray served in the Illinois House of Representatives from 1949 to 1951 and in the Illinois Senate from 1951 to 1963. Gray was a Democrat. Gray served as a probate and circuit court judge for St. Clair County, Illinois.  Gray died from a heart attack at his home in South Pasadena, Florida.

Notes

1915 births
1987 deaths
People from Belleville, Illinois
People from East St. Louis, Illinois
Military personnel from Illinois
Saint Louis University School of Law alumni
University of Illinois alumni
Illinois lawyers
Missouri lawyers
Illinois state court judges
Democratic Party members of the Illinois House of Representatives
Democratic Party Illinois state senators
20th-century American politicians
20th-century American judges
20th-century American lawyers